Doug Belk (born September 16, 1987) is an American football coach who is currently the defensive coordinator and safeties coach for Houston.

Coaching career

Valdosta State

Belk began his coaching career in 2011 at Division II Valdosta State. In his first year he worked as a defensive assistant and assisted with the special teams. In 2012 and 2013 he coached the team’s secondary, and they went on to win a division 2 national championship.

Alabama

In 2014 Belk took a pay cut in order to join Nick Saban’s Alabama staff as a graduate assistant. He stayed there until the end of the 2016 season, winning a national championship in 2015 and the SEC every year he was there.

West Virginia

In 2017 Belk was hired as the Mountaineers cornerbacks’ coach. He stayed there until the end of the 2018 season.

Houston

On January 11, 2019, it was announced that Belk followed Dana Holgorsen to Houston and became the team’s safeties coach in addition to the team’s co-defensive coordinator. In January 2020, he was given the additional title of associate head coach. On January 19, 2021 in addition to his positions as safeties coach and associate head coach, Belk was given control of the defense, becoming the sole defensive coordinator for Houston.

References

Living people
African-American coaches of American football
African-American players of American football
Carson–Newman Eagles football players
Alabama Crimson Tide football coaches
Coaches of American football from Georgia (U.S. state)
Houston Cougars football coaches
Players of American football from Georgia (U.S. state)
Valdosta State Blazers football coaches
West Virginia Mountaineers football coaches
21st-century African-American people
1987 births